The government-owned corporations of Puerto Rico —or public corporations— are a set of corporate entities owned entirely or in large part by the executive branch of the government of Puerto Rico or by its municipalities. The corporations engage in commercial activities with their revenues ultimately being allocated towards the government's treasury the Puerto Rico Consolidated Fund or towards the corresponding municipal treasury. Some of them have been criticized since their creation since they are not profitable and depend on the issue of bonds or large indebtedness to operate, or because they constitute a government monopoly or control a unique asset (such as a port, toll, or land).

As of 2015, the public corporations contributed to more than half of the public debt of Puerto Rico —a factor that contributed significantly to the Puerto Rican government-debt crisis — with COFINA, PRASA, PRHTA, and PREPA being the largest holders.

Owned by the executive branch

As of November 2012, the executive branch of the government of Puerto Rico owned 52 government-owned corporations with an outstanding debt of $48.7B USD.

Owned by municipalities

References

See also 
State-owned enterprises of the United States

 
Puerto Rico